Gabriel Maximiliano Migliónico Torres (born 20 January 1978) is an Argentine former footballer who played as a forward. His last club was Peruvian side CNI Iquitos.

References
 Profile at BDFA 
 
 Profile at Tenfield Digital 

1978 births
Living people
Footballers from Buenos Aires
Argentine footballers
Association football forwards
Club Atlético Colón footballers
Ñublense footballers
Unión de Sunchales footballers
Colegio Nacional Iquitos footballers
Argentine Primera División players
Chilean Primera División players
Argentine expatriate footballers
Argentine expatriate sportspeople in Chile
Expatriate footballers in Chile
Argentine expatriate sportspeople in Peru
Expatriate footballers in Peru
Argentine emigrants to Uruguay
Naturalized citizens of Uruguay
Uruguayan footballers
Danubio F.C. players
Centro Atlético Fénix players
Uruguayan expatriate footballers
Uruguayan expatriate sportspeople in Chile
Uruguayan expatriate sportspeople in Peru